Belle may refer to:
 Belle (Beauty and the Beast)
 Belle (given name), a list of people and fictional characters
 Belle (surname), a list of people

Brands and enterprises
 Belle Air, a former airline with headquarters in Tirana, Albania
 Belle Air Europe, a subsidiary of Belle Air in the Kosovo
 Belle Baby Carriers, an American baby carrier manufacturer
 Belle International, a Chinese footwear retailer

Film and television
 Belle (1973 film), a Belgian-French drama film by André Delvaux
 Belle (2013 film), a British film by Amma Asante
 Belle (2021 film), a Japanese animated film by Mamoru Hosoda
 Belle's, an American comedy TV series that premiered in 2013

Music
 Belle (album), a 2011 album by Bic Runga
 "Belle" (Patrick Fiori, Daniel Lavoie and Garou song), a song from the 1998 musical adaptation of Victor Hugo's novel Notre Dame de Paris
 "Belle" (Disney song), a song written for Disney's 1991 film Beauty and the Beast
 Belle, a 1961 musical by Wolf Mankowitz (lyrics) and Monty Norman (music)
 "Belle", a 1977 song written by Al Green, Fred Jordan and Reuben Fairfax, Jr.

Places
 Belle, Flanders or Bailleul, Nord, a commune in France
 Belle, Udupi, a village in India
 Belle, Missouri, a town in the United States
 Belle, United States
 Belle, West Virginia, a town in the United States

Railway trains
 Bournemouth Belle, a named train run by the Southern Railway (Great Britain) from 1931 until 1948
 Brighton Belle, a passenger train operated by the London, Brighton and South Coast Railway
 Devon Belle, a passenger train operated by the Southern Railway and then British Railways from 1947 to 1954

Science and technology
 Belle (chess machine), an early chess computer
 Belle experiment, an accelerator-based particle physics experiment
 Belle, the current version of Nokia's Symbian mobile operating system

Ships
 La Belle (ship), a ship lost in 1686 during a French colonization attempt in Texas
 USCS Belle (1848), a survey ship in service with the United Coast Survey from 1848 to 1857
 USS Belle (1864), a Union Navy steamer in the American Civil War
 Belle of Louisville, a passenger steamer in the Kentucky, U.S.
 Belle of Temagami, a passenger steamer in Ontario, Canada

Sports teams
 Battle Creek Belles, part of the All-American Girls Professional Baseball League (1951–1952)
 Doncaster Belles, now Doncaster Rovers Belles L.F.C., an English semi-professional women's football club
 Memphis Belles, member of the Independent Women's Football League
 Muskegon Belles, part of the All-American Girls Professional Baseball League (1953)
 Racine Belles, a team of the All-American Girls Professional Baseball League (1943–1950)

Other uses
Belle (card game), a 17th-century gambling card game
Belle (magazine), an Australian design magazine
Hurricane Belle, a storm of the 1976 Atlantic hurricane season

See also
 Bel (disambiguation)
 BEL (disambiguation)
 Bell (disambiguation)
 La Belle (disambiguation)
 Belle Isle (disambiguation)
 Belle River (disambiguation)
 Belles belles belles (musical), a 2003 musical by Redha
 Belle Époque
 Southern belle, a stock character representing a young woman of the American South's upper socioeconomic class